Sasneham... (translation: With Love) is a 1990 Malayalam language family film written by Lohithadas and directed by Sathyan Anthikad. It stars Balachandra Menon, Shobana, Innocent, Sukumari, Oduvil Unnikrishnan, Mamukkoya, Karamana Janardanan Nair and Paravoor Bharathan.

Johnson composed the music for the film with lyrics by P. K. Gopi. G. Venugopal won the Kerala State Film Award for Best Singer for the song "Thaane Poovitta Moham". The film was remade in Tamil as Manasu Rendum Pudhusu and in Telugu as Master Kapuram.

Plot
Thomaskutty, who hails from a conservative Christian family, marries a typical Tamil Brahmin girl, Saraswathy. Both are teachers by profession, working in the same school. They are left alone by their respective families for this reason. But both the families unite when a baby girl is born to the couple. Meenakshi Ammal, a bold and stubborn woman and Saraswathy's aunt tries to get possession of Sachu's child and wants the child to be brought in their household. On the other hand, The Christian relatives attempt to brainwash Thomaskutty. Though Saraswathy and Thomaskutty are separated by misfortune, circumstances that encircle their lives bring them together again. They decide  to live their lives in harmony without the interference of religion.

Cast

 Balachandra Menon as Thomas Kurian aka Thomaskutty, a school teacher
 Shobana as Saraswathy aka Sarasu
 Innocent as Eenashu, Thomaskutty's brother-in-law
 Sukumari as Meenakshy Ammal, Saraswathy's aunt
 Meena as Eliamma Ammachi, Thomaskutty's mother
 Oduvil Unnikrishnan as Srinivasa Iyer, Saraswathy's uncle
 K. P. A. C. Lalitha as Rosie, Thomaskutty's elder sister and Eenashu's wife
 Mamukkoya as Appukkuttan, the cook
 Karamana Janardanan Nair as Thamaraserry Kuriachan, Thomaskutty's father
 Paravoor Bharathan as Narayana Iyer, Saraswathy's father
 Sankaradi as Padmanabhan Nair, the house owner
 Philomina as Veronica, Eenashu's mother
 Santha Devi as School principal
 Thesni Khan as a nurse

Soundtrack

References

External links
 

1990s Malayalam-language films
Films directed by Sathyan Anthikad
Malayalam films remade in other languages
Films with screenplays by A. K. Lohithadas
Films scored by Johnson